Jeremy Cumpston (born 10 January 1967, Darwin, Northern Territory) is an Australian doctor, actor and director most known for his work as Connor Costello on All Saints, an Australian hospital drama.

Early life 
Cumpston was born in Darwin to Noelene and Trevor Cumpston. Noelene's mother was Afghan-Aboriginal of Barkandji heritage, and her father was the head doctor of the New Broken Hill Mines. Trevor was a radiographer based in Darwin working on a program to provide X-ray screenings for tuberculosis in remote Aboriginal communities when Jeremy was born.

The family moved to Canada, where Cumpston's father was the hospital administrator for a small town. When Jeremy was eight they briefly returned to Australia but then went back to Canada, and this time his father worked at the hospital base for the world's second largest nickel mine, in Thompson, Manitoba, located north of the 63rd parallel.

At age 11, Cumpston and his parents and four sisters returned to live in South Australia. At the end of Year 12 he decided to study Medicine despite his love of drama. While Cumpston pursued his medical career, he was still interested in acting so auditioned and was accepted into the Victorian College of the Arts (VCA). He couldn't defer his intern year so he had to pass up the place.

After completing his internship at Wollongong Hospital and Sydney's Prince Henry Hospital, Cumpston enrolled in classes at The Actor's Centre where his classmates included Hugh Jackman and Jason Clarke. Cumpston then worked as general practitioner before heading off to Perth for three years' full-time acting study at the Western Australian Academy of Performing Arts (WAAPA).

Career 
Whilst in his final year at WAAPA in 1995, Cumpston worked as a GP full-time for six weeks during his holidays to save money which enabled him to produce and then perform in the one-man play Shadow Boxing. He performed in Adelaide and had a return season in Perth. This was the first play produced by the Tamarama Rock Surfers theatre company which he co-founded with Michael Gwynne and his sister Zena Cumpston in 1994.

After graduation, Cumpston obtained an agent which led him to a role with the Sydney Theatre Company's 1996 production of Miracle City, directed by Gale Edwards. Next came the lead in the New England Theatre Company's production of Romeo and Juliet and then the role of Mercutio in the Glenn Elston production of Romeo and Juliet in the Botanic Gardens.

In 1997, Cumpston took a role at an Aboriginal medical centre in Sydney's western suburbs while continuing to audition and work on guest roles in Murder Call and Roar. The Tamarama Rock Surfers' first Sydney project, Road, directed by Simon Lyndon was produced by Cumpston and he performed in it. He then directed Three Strikes at the Old Fitzroy Hotel, which had a sellout season.

From 1998 to 2001 Cumpston played the "lovable rogue" nurse Connor Costello in the Australian medical drama All Saints. During his time on the show, Cumpston kept up his real medical career by writing a medical column in a weekly magazine and working in a clinic on Saturdays.

In 1998, Cumpston directed Pitchfork and co-produced Diary of a Madman. In 1999 he is directed and starring in Amco Riders at the Old Fitzroy Hotel in Sydney.

Cumpston founded the Old Fitzroy Theatre in 1997 with the other members of the Tamarama Rock Surfers but the group folded in 2015.

Cumpston directed short films 'Free' in 2003, 'The Sky is Always Beautiful' in 2007 and 'The Last Race' in 2011.

Cumpston directed the movie "Bilched" that was written by his son Hal Cumpston. The film was shot in 2019 and received a national release in Australia. At the 2019 Chelsea Film Festival it won the award for Best Screenplay, Best supporting actor (Frederick Du Rietz) and the Grand Prix Best Feature Film.

In his medical career, Cumpston ran a series of cosmetic clinics, Ageless Clinics, across New South Wales. In 2020 his license to practice expired and he was called on by AHPRA to provide proof of proper professional indemnity insurance coverage to the Medical Board of Australia.

Personal life 
During his time in All Saints, Cumpston worked with his then partner, props buyer and later producer, Rachel Lane who became the mother to his eldest son Hal, born in 1999.

In 2005, Cumpston married Jessica Brentnall and had 2 sons and a daughter together before separating in 2010.

Cumpston's sister Nici received an Order of Australia as nominated by the elders from Anangu Pitjantjatjara Yankunytjatjara Lands for her service to the museums and galleries sector, and to Indigenous art.

References

External links

Living people
1967 births
Australian directors
Australian male television actors
Australian medical doctors
Indigenous Australian male actors
University of Adelaide Medical School alumni
Western Australian Academy of Performing Arts alumni